Mohsen Armin is an Iranian politician. He was a representative for Tehran and vice speaker of the Majlis during the sixth term of the Majlis. He is also a central committee member and speaker of Mojahedin of the Islamic Revolution of Iran Organization.

References

Living people
Iranian reformists
Mojahedin of the Islamic Revolution of Iran Organization politicians
Deputies of Tehran, Rey, Shemiranat and Eslamshahr
Iran University of Science and Technology alumni
Members of the 6th Islamic Consultative Assembly
1954 births
Second Deputies of Islamic Consultative Assembly
Islamic Revolutionary Guard Corps officers